The Barber Institute of Fine Arts is an art gallery and concert hall in Birmingham, England. It is  situated in purpose-built premises on the campus of the University of Birmingham.

The Grade I listed Art Deco building was designed by Robert Atkinson in the 1930s and opened in 1939 by Queen Mary. The first building to be purpose-built for the study of art history in the United Kingdom, it was described by architectural historian Sir John Summerson as representing "better than almost any other building (except, perhaps the RIBA in Portland Place) the spirit of English architecture in the 1930s." The layout of the museum is centred on a central concert hall which is surrounded by lecture halls, offices and libraries on the ground floor and art galleries on the first floor.

In the 2005 Penguin Books publication Britain's Best Museums and Galleries, the Barber Institute was one of only five galleries outside London to receive five stars for having "Outstanding collections of international significance" (the others were the National Gallery of Scotland, Oxford University's Ashmolean Museum, Cambridge University's Fitzwilliam Museum and the Walker Art Gallery, Liverpool).

Location and history

The institute is located 5 km southwest of the city centre at the East Gate of the university campus and has one of the outstanding collections of art assembled in Britain in the 20th century, including works by Gwen John, André Derain, Fernand Léger, René Magritte and Egon Schiele. It was set up by Martha Constance Hattie Barber in memory of her husband Henry Barber, a wealthy property developer who made his fortune expanding Birmingham's sprawling suburbs. Lady Barber was a descendant of the old Worcestershire Onions family of bellows-makers and was an heiress in her own right.
By his mid-thirties, the couple had retired but their connections with the city remained strong. In 1924, Henry Barber received a baronetcy for 'Political Services to Birmingham'.

He died three years later. Lady Barber decided to make a permanent contribution to the city in his memory. On 13 December 1932, the Barber Institute of Fine Arts was founded, and was bequeathed to the university 'for the study and encouragement of art and music'. Lady Barber died four months later leaving all of her assets to the trustees of the institute. This money was used to acquire works of art for a collection and fund the construction of a new building. In order to ensure that only artworks of the highest quality were bought for the Barber Institute, its founding trust deed stipulated that all purchases should be 'of that standard of quality as required by the National Gallery and the Wallace Collection'.

The founding director (from 1935 to 1952) was Thomas Bodkin, who acquired the nucleus of the collection described by The Observer as "the last great art collection of the twentieth century". Bodkin's successor was Professor Ellis Waterhouse who served from 1952 to 1970. The current director of the Barber is Nicola Kalinsky, previously deputy director and chief curator of the Scottish National Portrait Gallery. She joined the Barber in the midst of its 80th anniversary programme as it planned for a major redevelopment of its building.

Collections
The collection is full of famous works by artists such as Vincent van Gogh, Claude Monet, Auguste Rodin, J. M. W. Turner and Rubens, displayed in spacious and elegant galleries on the first floor of the institute. The Renaissance is represented by masterpieces by Sandro Botticelli, Giovanni Bellini, Veronese and Simone Martini (e.g. his St John the Evangelist of 1320), the 17th century by artists including Rubens, Van Dyck, Poussin and Murillo.

The collections of French Impressionism and Post-impressionism include artworks by Degas, Monet, Renoir, Van Gogh and Gauguin. Among the British artists represented are Aubrey Beardsley, Gainsborough, Reynolds, Rossetti, Whistler and Turner. There is also a fine collection of sculpture (including works by Rodin and Degas), Old Master prints and drawings, portrait miniatures and objets d'art. Standing at the entrance is the Equestrian Statue of George I, the oldest public sculpture in Birmingham. In 2013 the gallery acquired an important and commanding late work by Sir Joshua Reynolds: Maria Marow Gideon (1767–1834) and her Brother William (1775–1805), and in 2015 acquired George Bellows' Miss Bentham (1906), its first American painting, and only the second of Bellows' paintings to enter a public collection in the United Kingdom.

The institute also has one of the world's largest coin collections, especially of Roman and Byzantine coins. This outstanding collection was supplemented in 1967 with 15,000 coins, from Phillip Whitting and Geoffrey Haines. Many concerts take place at the Barber throughout the year, as well as a music festival which is held in June.

860 items of the Shaw-Hellier collection are held at the Barber's music library.

Major works
The Harvest Wagon, Thomas Gainsborough
Symphony in White, No. 3, Whistler

Gallery

References
 Barber Institute was 'Gallery of the Year' in 2004

External links

 Official website
 Your Icons  Highlights from the Barber Institute collection

Grade II listed buildings in Birmingham
Concert halls in England
Tourist attractions in Birmingham, West Midlands
Art museums and galleries in Birmingham, West Midlands
University of Birmingham
University museums in England
Numismatic museums in the United Kingdom
Art Deco architecture in England
Art museums established in 1932
1932 establishments in England